Thomas Vicars (1589 – 1638) was a 17th-century English theologian and rhetorician.

He was born in Carlisle in Cumberland (now Cumbria), the son of William and Eve Vicars. He entered Queen's College, Oxford in 1607 as a poor serving child. He then became a tabarder, chaplain and fellow within nine years. In 1622, he was admitted to the reading of the sentences. Recognised as a learned theologian, he entered the household of George Carleton, the Bishop of Chichester, whose step-daughter, Anne, the daughter of the sometime Ambassador to France, Henry Neville of Billingbear House in Berkshire, he married. Carleton made him Vicar of Cuckfield in West Sussex.

His works include:

Translation of Bartholomew Keckermann's Latin 'Manuduction to Theology', dedicated to 'Lady Anne Neville' (his mother-in-law) and 'Lady Anne Fettiplace of Childrey' in Berkshire, the mother of John Fettiplace MP (1620)
'Manuductio ad artem rhetoricam' (1621)
'A Brief Direction on how to examine Ourselves before we go to the Lord's Table' (1622)
'Confutatio cusjd' (1627)

References
Anthony Wood (1815) Athenae Oxonienses

1589 births
1638 deaths
English Christian theologians
Fellows of The Queen's College, Oxford
People from Carlisle, Cumbria
People from Cuckfield
16th-century Anglican theologians
17th-century Anglican theologians